Bunny Christie  (born 1962) is a Scottish theatre set designer.

Career
She was born in St Andrews, educated at Madras College and at the Central School of Art in London. She has won four Olivier Awards and also worked on Kenneth Branagh's Oscar-nominated short film Swan Song.

Christie designed the sets and costumes for The Curious Incident of the Dog in the Night-Time, which was initially produced at the Royal National Theatre in 2012, and also was performed on Broadway in 2014.

In 2014, Christie designed the set for the new musical Made in Dagenham. She designed the set for People, Places and Things which ran at the Royal National Theatre in 2015 and Off-Broadway at St. Ann's Warehouse in 2017.

In 2018, she designed the set for Marianne Elliot’s gender bending revival of the musical Company. The musical opened in the West End in 2018.

She was appointed Officer of the Order of the British Empire (OBE) in the 2019 New Year Honours for her services to British theatre.

David Jays, writing in The Guardian, described her style: "Bunny Christie doesn’t design stage sets. She creates worlds. Audaciously theatrical and frequently startling, her creations pull spectators headlong into the universe of a play – whether through the disorienting aperture of The Red Barn or the vintage newsroom pile-up in Ink. Christie often places us inside a protagonist’s head – she designs psychology as well as space, most notably for the singular hero of The Curious Incident, which won her one of her three Olivier awards."

Awards and nominations

References

British scenic designers
1962 births
Living people
Alumni of the Central School of Art and Design
Tony Award winners
Laurence Olivier Award winners
Officers of the Order of the British Empire
Date of birth missing (living people)
Women scenic designers
People educated at Madras College